Tux Droid is a Linux wireless Tux mascot (210mm × 180mm × 140mm - with lowered wings) with a programmable interface, allowing it to announce events by its gestures and by ALSA driven sound. The events are detected by specific gadgets, which are handled by the Tux Gadget Manager. The Tux Droid supports Linux kernel 2.4 or later and needs an 800 MHz CPU and 128 MB RAM. Communication from Tux Droid to the computer is via signalling operating in the 802.11 WLAN band, but not compatible with Wi-Fi. The receiver resembles a plastic fish, and connects to the host computer's USB port.  An infrared remote control is supplied; signals from this are received by Tux Droid and sent to the host software over the wireless link. For media detection it needs an internet connection. The mascot is driven by Atmel AVR RISC microcontrollers.
The new version supports also Windows-based PCs. The Tux Droid can be used with Windows XP and Windows Vista (both at 32 Bit).

Information 
Kysoh society has filed for bankruptcy in August 2010.
Official sites are unavailable.
Two communities are available to get help and information on Tux Droid.

See also
Speech synthesis
Tux

References

External links 

 homepage of Tux Droid 
 Tuxdroid-community – Unofficial Community 
 joelmatteotti at github

Linux
Fictional penguins
Free software culture and documents
Virtual pets
Pets
Entertainment robots
Open-source robots